Whitehorse West is an electoral district which returns a member (known as an MLA) to the Legislative Assembly of the Yukon Territory in Canada.

The Whitehorse district is the smallest riding, by size, in the Yukon and includes the subdivisions of Logan, Ingram, Arkell, and part of Copper Ridge. It is bordered by the ridings of Mountainvew, Takhini-Kopper King, and Copperbelt North.

History

While it is one of the oldest ridings in the Yukon by name, the current riding no longer represents its initial boundaries, nor even the boundaries as recent as the 2000 general election due to the continued residential development in that area of the city.

Whitehorse West is the former seat of Yukon Premier Tony Penikett of the Yukon New Democratic Party, Deputy Premier Elaine Taylor of the Yukon Party, Dennis Schneider, 8th Speaker of the Yukon Legislative Assembly, and Ken McKinnon, former Commissioner of the Yukon.

Initially considered a New Democrat stronghold, the riding evolved into a largely Yukon Party stronghold, despite falling to the Liberals in 2016. However, Whitehorse West could also be viewed as a bellwether, as it has voted for the governing party in every territorial election since 1985, except one (1992).

Whitehorse West was the only seat won by the Yukon New Democratic Party in the 1978 territorial election.

MLAs

Electoral results

2021 general election

2016 general election

|-

| Liberal
| Richard Mostyn
| align="right"| 455
| align="right"| 45.8%
| align="right"| +17.1%
|-

|-

| NDP
| Stu Clark
| align="right"| 106
| align="right"| 10.7%
| align="right"| -2.2%
|-
! align=left colspan=3|Total
! align=right| 994
! align=right| 100.0%
! align=right| –
|}

2011 general election

|-

|-

| Liberal
| Cully Robinson
| align="right"| 209
| align="right"| 28.7%
| align="right"| -9.9%
|-

| NDP
| Louis Gagnon
| align="right"| 94
| align="right"| 12.9%
| align="right"| +5.1%
|-
! align=left colspan=3|Total
! align=right| 729
! align=right| 100.0%
! align=right| –
|}

2006 general election

|-

|-

| Liberal
| Mike Walton
| align="right"| 371
| align="right"| 38.6%
| align="right"| +0.6%
|-

| NDP
| Rhoda Merkel
| align="right"| 75
| align="right"| 7.8%
| align="right"| -6.1%
|-
! align=left colspan=3|Total
! align=right| 963
! align=right| 100.0%
! align=right| –
|}

2002 general election

|-

|-

| Liberal
| Dennis Schneider
| align="right"| 319
| align="right"| 38.0%
| align="right"| -2.5%
|-

| NDP
| Rachel Grantham
| align="right"| 117
| align="right"| 13.9%
| align="right"| -17.4%
|-
! align=left colspan=3|Total
! align=right| 840
! align=right| 100.0%
! align=right| –
|}

2000 general election

|-

| Liberal
| Dennis Schneider
| align="right"| 621
| align="right"| 40.5%
| align="right"| +8.4%

| NDP
| Dave Sloan
| align="right"| 480
| align="right"| 31.3%
| align="right"| -9.4%

|-
! align=left colspan=3|Total
! align=right| 1535
! align=right| 100.0%
! align=right| –
|}

1996 general election

|-

| NDP
| Dave Sloan
| align="right"| 486
| align="right"| 40.7%
| align="right"| -1.6%
|-

| Liberal
| Larry Bagnell
| align="right"| 383
| align="right"| 32.1%
| align="right"| +0.2%
|-

|-
! align=left colspan=3|Total
! align=right| 1195
! align=right| 100.0%
! align=right| –
|}

1996 by-election

}
|-

| NDP
| Dave Sloan
| align="right"| 433
| align="right"| 42.3%
| align="right"| -3.3%

 
|Liberal
| Larry Bagnell
| align="right"| 326
| align="right"| 31.9%
| align="right"| +14.8%

|- bgcolor="white"
!align="left" colspan=3|Total
! align=right| 1023
! align=right| 100.0%
! align=right| –

On the resignation of Tony Penikett, 1995

1992 general election

|-

| NDP
| Tony Penikett
| align="right"| 304
| align="right"| 45.6%
| align="right"| -9.7%
|-

|-

| Liberal
| Shaun Patrick Dennehy
| align="right"| 114
| align="right"| 17.1%
| align="right"| +6.2%
|-

| Independent
| Bernd Schmidt
| align="right"| 12
| align="right"| 1.8%
| align="right"| +1.8%
|-
! align=left colspan=3|Total
! align=right| 666
! align=right| 100.0%
! align=right| –
|}
 The Yukon Progressive Conservative Party re-branded itself as the Yukon Party before the 1992 election.

1989 general election

|-

| NDP
| Tony Penikett
| align="right"| 810
| align="right"| 55.3%
| align="right"| -1.9%
|-

|-

| Liberal
| Joe Jack
| align="right"| 160
| align="right"| 10.9%
| align="right"| +10.9%
|-
! align=left colspan=3|Total
! align=right| 1465
! align=right| 100.0%
! align=right| –
|}

1985 general election

|-

| NDP
| Tony Penikett
| align="right"| 716
| align="right"| 57.2%
| align="right"| +8.5%
|-

|-
! align=left colspan=3|Total
! align=right| 1251
! align=right| 100.0%
! align=right| –
|}

1982 general election

|-

| NDP
| Tony Penikett
| align="right"| 541
| align="right"| 48.7%
| align="right"| +17.4%
|-

|-

| Liberal
| Adam Skrutkowski
| align="right"| 59
| align="right"| 5.3%
| align="right"| -21.9%
|-
! align=left colspan=3|Total
! align=right| 1112
! align=right| 100.0%
! align=right| –
|}

1978 general election

|-

| NDP
| Tony Penikett
| align="right"| 230
| align="right"| 31.3%
| align="right"| –
|-

| Liberal
| John Watt
| align="right"| 200
| align="right"| 27.2%
| align="right"| –
|-

|-

| Independent
| Al Omatani
| align="right"| 81
| align="right"| 11.0%
| align="right"| –
|-

| Independent
| Guy Julien
| align="right"| 37
| align="right"| 5.0%
| align="right"| –
|-
! align=left colspan=3|Total
! align=right| 736
! align=right| 100.0%
! align=right| –
|}
Partisan politics introduced into the territory

1974 general election

|-

| Independent
| Flo Whyard
| align="right"| 252
| align="right"| 42.3%
| align="right"| –
|-

| Independent
| John Watt
| align="right"| 227
| align="right"| 38.1%
| align="right"| –
|-

| Independent
| Al Omatani
| align="right"| 116
| align="right"| 19.5%
| align="right"| –
|-
! align=left colspan=3|Total
! align=right| 596
! align=right| 100.0%
! align=right| –
|}

1970 general election

|-

| Independent
| Ken McKinnon
| align="right"| 444
| align="right"| 23.4%
| align="right"| –
|-

| Independent
| John Watt
| align="right"| 294
| align="right"| 28.7%
| align="right"| –
|-

| Independent
| John P. Hoyt
| align="right"| 281
| align="right"| 27.5%
| align="right"| –
|-
! align=left colspan=3|Total
! align=right| 1023
! align=right| 100.0%
! align=right| –
|}

References

Yukon territorial electoral districts
Politics of Whitehorse